Alison Assiter (born 23 October 1949),  is the Professor of Feminist Theory at the University of the West of England.

Education 
Assiter gained her degree from Bristol University, her B.Phil. from Somerville College, Oxford, and her D.Phil. from Sussex University in 1984.

Career 
In the early 2000s, Assiter was the dean of the Faculty of Economics and Social Science at UWE Bristol, and the London School of Economics visiting professor of sociology in January 2006.

Assiter's book Kierkegaard, Eve and Metaphors of Birth was described as "an important contribution to the general subject matter of realizable well-being" and "illuminating and thought-provoking". It has also been reviewed by Times Higher Education.

Bibliography

See also

 Louis Althusser
 Avedon Carol
 Immanuel Kant
 Søren Kierkegaard
 Socrates
 Code Pink

References

External links
 

1949 births
Academics of the University of the West of England, Bristol
Alumni of Somerville College, Oxford
Alumni of the University of Sussex
Alumni of the University of the West of England, Bristol
British feminists
British women's rights activists
Living people
Place of birth missing (living people)
Fellows of the Academy of Social Sciences
British women non-fiction writers